Lisa Altenburg ( Hahn, born 23 September 1989) is a German field hockey player. She was part of the German bronze medal winning team at the 2016 Olympic Games and also played for Germany at the 2012 Summer Olympics.  She is the niece of Birgit Hahn who also played Olympic hockey for Germany.

References

External links
 
 
 
 
 

1989 births
Living people
German female field hockey players
Field hockey players at the 2012 Summer Olympics
Field hockey players at the 2016 Summer Olympics
Field hockey players at the 2020 Summer Olympics
Olympic field hockey players of Germany
Sportspeople from Mönchengladbach
Olympic bronze medalists for Germany
Olympic medalists in field hockey
Medalists at the 2016 Summer Olympics
Female field hockey forwards
21st-century German women

2018 FIH Indoor Hockey World Cup players